Oleksiy Viktorovych Kolokoltsev  (Олексій Вікторович Колокольцев, born ) is a Ukrainian male weightlifter, competing in the +105 kg category and representing Ukraine at international competitions. He participated at the 2004 Summer Olympics in the +105 kg event. He competed at world championships, most recently at the 2005 World Weightlifting Championships.

Major results
  2002 European Championships +105 kg (427.5 kg)

References

External links
 

1981 births
Living people
Ukrainian male weightlifters
Weightlifters at the 2004 Summer Olympics
Olympic weightlifters of Ukraine
Place of birth missing (living people)
European Weightlifting Championships medalists
20th-century Ukrainian people
21st-century Ukrainian people